The Egyptian Field Hospital at Bagram opened in 2003.
The hospital treats more than 7,000 Afghans per month.
Treatment is provided free of charge.
31 percent of the hospitals patients are children.

Liam Fox, writing in The Telegraph, described the Egyptian Hospital at Bagram as an exception to "almost non-existent" engagement in Afghanistan by the Muslim world.

References

Parwan Province
Military hospitals
Military units and formations of Egypt
Hospitals in Afghanistan
2003 establishments in Afghanistan
Hospitals established in 2003